The emblem of the Crimean Autonomous Soviet Socialist Republic was adopted in 1921 by the government of the Crimean Autonomous Soviet Socialist Republic. The emblem was similar to the emblem of the Russian Soviet Federative Socialist Republic.

History 
On November 10, 1921, the first All-Crimean Constituent Congress of Soviets adopted the Constitution of the Crimean Soviet Socialist Republic, which contained the description of the emblem of the Crimean SSR. The emblem of the Crimean SSR is described in Article 35 of the Constitution:

First revision 
Between 1921 and 1924, a change was made to the emblem. The Crimean Tatar inscriptions were removed from the emblem.

Second revision 
After the translation of the Crimean Tatar script from Arabic into Latinized alphabet in 1928, the inscriptions in the arms of the Autonomous Crimean SSR also were made in Latinized graphics.

Third revision 
In 1937, on the basis of the Constitution of the USSR of 1936 and the Constitution of the RSFSR of 1937, the Constitution of the Crimean Autonomous Soviet Socialist Republic was adopted, which contained the description of the State Emblem of the Crimean Autonomous Soviet Socialist Republic:

Fourth revision 
In 1938, the writing system of the Crimean Tatar language was changed from Latin to Cyrillic. In accordance with this, changes also occurred in the emblem.

Gallery

References 

Crimean Autonomous Soviet Socialist Republic
Crimean ASSR
Crimean ASSR
Crimean ASSR
Crimean ASSR
Crimean ASSR